Baba Ram Chandra (1864/1875–1950) was an Indian trade unionist who organised the farmers of Awadh, India into forming a united front to fight against the abuses of landlords in 1920s and 1930s. He was also an influential figure in the history of Fiji, and owed his inspiration to take up the cause of the down-trodden to his 12 years as an indentured labourer in Fiji and to his efforts to end the indenture system. He is one of the prime characters in Kamla Kant Tripathi's history based novel "Bedakhal".

Early years
Ram Chandra was born in a small village in Gwalior State in 1864  or 1875. His real name was Shridhar Balwant. Some sources say he is from Maharastra. He left for Fiji as an indentured labourer in 1904 after changing his name to Ram Chandra Rao in order to conceal his identity as a person from priestly class, since priestly class people were not preferred as indentured labourers.

His stay in Fiji as an indentured labour 
He stayed in Fiji for thirteen years and took active part in the movement to emancipate the lot of the indentured labourers. He came in contact with Manilal Doctor, who took keen interest in social and political movements in Fiji. Ram Chandra used religion to organise the people. He was responsible for the staging of Ram Lila in Fiji which helped in creating a sense of solidarity among the Indian indentured labourers. He also ensured the dismissal of an official who rode roughshod over the religious sentiments of the labourers. He led popular demonstrations in Fiji to focus on the grievances of indentured labourers. He smuggled into India an article on the deplorable and inhuman conditions of indentured labourers, which was published in Bharat Mitra, a newspaper from Calcutta. The Fiji Government was alarmed by this article and was on the look out for its writer. The article created such a furore that Ram Chandra was advised by his friends to leave Fiji before the authorities were able to lay their hands on him. He left Fiji in 1916.

Organising farmers in India 
On his return to India he settled in Ayodhya and became a sadhu (holy man). He was accused by the local police of spreading disaffection among the peasantry. He married a woman of Chamar caste  and commenced calling himself "Baba Ram Chandra." He moved around the region with a copy of the Ramayana under his arm, blending readings from this popular Hindu epic with denunciations of both the British Raj and the landlords, and appealed to the peasants to act together against their exploiters. Although he began by seeking to harmonise tenant-landlord relations, Ram Chandra soon considered this to be a wasted effort and began to mobilise the peasants. He encouraged peasants to pay only the required rent and refrain from customary donations. In 1919 he led the first peasant protest against the landlords and by 1920 had organised all the farmers associations in Oudh, forming the Oudh Kisan Sabha (Oudh Farmers’ Association). He was arrested on a number of occasions for organising public protests. He established Oudh Kisan Sabha and organised farmers' protest, but he did not get support from Indian National Congress.

In June 1920, Nehru toured the villages of Awadh. By October the sabha was headed by Baba Ramchandra, Nehru and a few others. Within a month it had set up over 300 branches. It helped integrate the peasants in the NCM.

When tried to get the support of Nehru and other Indian National Congress leaders to fight for the rights of the farmers, he was disappointed to discover that the Congress, with its urban-based leadership, was concerned only with independence and did not seem to understand the needs of the peasants.

External links 
 The Origins of the Peasant Agitation in Oudh
 Baba and Non-Cooperator Congress

References

 M.H. Siddiqi, Agrarian Unrest in North India 1918-1922, Vikas Publishing House, New Delhi, 1978
 K. Kumar, Peasants in Revolt: Tenants, Landlords, Congress and the Raj in Oudh, 1886-1922, Manohar Publications, Delhi, 1984.
 Kapil Kumar, The Ramcharitmanas as a Radical Text: Baba Ram Chandra in Oudh, 1920-1950, in Social Transformation and Creative Imagination, 1984.

1864 births
1950 deaths
Indian emigrants to Fiji
Marathi people
Fijian Hindus
Fijian trade unionists
Trade unionists from Maharashtra